The 1986 NFL season was the 67th regular season of the National Football League. Defending Super Bowl Champion Chicago Bears shared the league’s best record with the Giants at 14–2, with the Giants claiming the spot in the NFC by tiebreakers. In the AFC, the Cleveland Browns earned home-field advantage with a record of 12–4, and they hosted the New York Jets in round one of the AFC playoffs. The Jets had started the season at 10–1 before losing their final five contests.  The game went to double OT, with the Browns finally prevailing 23–20.  The following Sunday, John Elway and the Denver  Broncos defeated the Browns by an identical score in a game known for The Drive, where Elway drove his team 98 yards to send the game to overtime to win.  The Giants would defeat their rival Washington Redskins in the NFC title game, blanking them 17–0 to advance to their first Super Bowl.  The season ended with Super Bowl XXI when the New York Giants defeated the Denver Broncos 39–20 at the Rose Bowl to win their first league title in 30 years.

Player movement

Transactions
November 8, 1986: Steve Tasker was claimed off waivers by the Buffalo Bills.

Trades

Draft
The 1986 NFL Draft was held from April 29 to 30, 1986 at New York City's Marriott Marquis. With the first pick, the Tampa Bay Buccaneers selected runningback Bo Jackson from Auburn University.

New referee
Dick Hantak was promoted to referee after serving eight seasons as a back judge (the position title was changed to field judge in 1998). Fred Silva was then assigned as a swing official instead of his own crew after suffering a heart attack in the offseason. Chuck Heberling was scheduled to be an instant replay official, but was asked to remain on the field following Silva's heart attack. Herberling earned assignment to the AFC championship.

Major rule changes
Players are prohibited from wearing apparel, equipment, or other items that carry commercial names, names of organizations, or any type of personal message unless they get specific permission from the league.
If the offensive team commits a dead ball foul during the last two minutes of a half, the clock will start at the snap.
If an offensive player fumbles the ball and it goes forward and out of bounds, the ball is returned to that team at the spot of the fumble.
If an offensive player fumbles the ball in the field of play and it goes out of bounds in the opponent's end zone, the ball is given to the defensive team at the spot of the fumble (this rule would be changed in 1991 to result in a touchback).
A limited system of instant replay was adopted to aid officiating. A replay official in a booth would decide what plays to review and make the final ruling, regardless of the current score or the amount of time left in the game. The replay official communicated with the game officials via radio transmitters. However, there was no time limit on how long the replay official could review a play and this led to long game delays (this was a major reason why the system was eventually repealed in 1992 and not brought back until a more comprehensive replay system with time limits were established in 1999).

American Bowl
A series of National Football League pre-season exhibition games that were held at sites outside the United States, the only American Bowl game in 1986 was held at London’s Wembley Stadium.

Regular season

Scheduling formula

Highlights of the 1986 season included:
Thanksgiving: Two games were played on Thursday, November 27, featuring Green Bay at Detroit and Seattle at Dallas, with Green Bay and Seattle winning.

Final standings

Tiebreakers
Denver was second AFC playoff seed ahead of New England based on head-to-head victory (1–0).
N.Y. Jets were the first AFC Wild Card based on better conference record (8–4) than Kansas City (9–5), Seattle (7–5), and Cincinnati (7–5).
Kansas City was the second AFC Wild Card based on better conference record (9–5) than Seattle (7–5) and Cincinnati (7–5).
N.Y. Giants were the top NFC playoff seed based on better conference record than Chicago (11–1 to Bears' 10–2).

Playoffs

Milestones
The following players set all-time records during the season:

Statistical leaders

Team

Awards

Coaching changes

Offseason
Houston Oilers: Jerry Glanville began his first full season as head coach after taking over for Hugh Campbell, who was fired after 14 games in 1985.
Minnesota Vikings: Bud Grant stepped down and was replaced by Jerry Burns, who became a professional head coach for the first time, and a head coach at any level for the first time since coaching the Iowa Hawkeyes from 1961-65. 
New Orleans Saints: Jim Mora, who went 48-13-1 as coach of the Philadelphia/Baltimore Stars of the United States Football League, became the new Saints head coach. Bum Phillips resigned after 12 games in 1985. Wade Phillips, his son and the team's defensive coordinator, served as interim for the last four games.
Philadelphia Eagles: Chicago Bears defensive coordinator Buddy Ryan was hired as the Eagles' new head coach. Marion Campbell was fired before the final game of the 1985 season; Fred Bruney as interim for that last game.
St. Louis Cardinals: Jim Hanifan was fired and replaced by Gene Stallings, a Dallas Cowboys assistant from 1972–85, and head coach of the Texas A&M Aggies from 1965-71.

In-season
Buffalo Bills: Hank Bullough was fired after 9 games into the season. Marv Levy was named as Bullough's replacement. Levy, the former head coach of the Kansas City Chiefs (1978–1982) and the USFL's Chicago Blitz (1984), was out of coaching since his stint with the Blitz when the Bills hired him. Levy went on to lead the Bills through 1997, with four consecutive Super Bowl appearances from 1990-93. 
Indianapolis Colts: Rod Dowhower was fired after the Colts lost their first 13 games. Former SMU and New England Patriots coach Ron Meyer was named as replacement, and promptly led the team to three straight victories to finish 3–13. He coached the Colts until he was fired midway through the 1991 season. 
San Diego Chargers: Don Coryell left after a 1–7 start. Al Saunders finished out the season, and remained in the position through 1988.

Uniform changes
 The Buffalo Bills began wearing their white pants with their white jerseys, discontinuing their blue pants. This was the first time the Bills wore white pants with their white jerseys since 1972.
 The New Orleans Saints switched to gold pants, discontinuing both their black and white pants. A secondary logo featuring a fleur-de-lis inside an outline of the state of Louisiana was added to both the jersey sleeves and the sides of the pants. The Saints retained this look through 1995.
 The numbers on the San Diego Chargers' blue jerseys changed from gold to white.

Television
This was the fifth and final year under the league's broadcast contracts with ABC, CBS, and NBC to televise Monday Night Football, the NFC package, and the AFC package, respectively. This was the last season that games remained primarily on broadcast television, as the league would sign a deal with the cable channel ESPN to broadcast a series of Sunday night games starting in 1987.

ABC opted to go to a two-man booth, dropping Joe Namath and O. J. Simpson, moving Frank Gifford to its sole color commentator, and having Al Michaels serve as the new play-by-announcer. Gifford would once again call the play-by-play during those weeks when Michaels was busy calling the Major League Baseball playoffs, and Lynn Swann or Simpson would fill-in.

References

 NFL Record and Fact Book
 NFL History 1981–1990 (Last accessed December 4, 2005)
 Total Football: The Official Encyclopedia of the National Football League

 
National Football League seasons
NFL season